The Noveritis, also variously known as the Announcement of Easter and the Moveable Feasts (in the post-1970 Roman Missal) or the Epiphany proclamation, is a liturgical chant sung on the Feast of Epiphany that contains a summary of liturgical dates of moveable feasts in the year ahead. Noveritis comes from the incipit of the chant. It is sung to the same tune as the Exsultet.

The practice is found principally in the Roman Catholic Church, but is also observed in some parishes of other Western rite denominations, including the Anglican Communion and Lutheran churches.

Ancient practice
According to ancient custom, the priest announced the date of Easter on the feast of Epiphany. This tradition dated from a time when calendars were not readily available, and the church needed to publicise the date of Easter, since many celebrations of the liturgical year depend on it.

In many parts of the world the Noveritis fell into disuse during the latter twentieth century, but some sources suggest a notable revival of its use in the early years of the twenty-first century.

Usage
The Roman Missal provides a formula with appropriate chant (in the same tone as the Exsultet) for proclaiming on Epiphany, wherever it is customary to do so, the dates in the calendar for the celebration of Ash Wednesday, Easter Sunday, Ascension Day, Pentecost, Corpus Christi, and the Advent Sunday, that will mark the following liturgical year. In the Mass of Paul VI, the proclamation may be sung or proclaimed at the ambo by a priest, deacon, cantor, or reader, either after the reading of the Gospel or after the postcommunion prayer. 

A number of liturgical resource websites provide the full text annually, with dates specific to the year. Similar resources are provided directly to the clergy by the bishops in some regions.

References

 
Christian terminology